Brian Sommer is an American voice actor who began his career in 2001. Brian has provided the voice of characters in 200 video game titles including, Telltale Games' The Walking Dead and Wolf Among Us, Blizzard Entertainment's Diablo III and Hearthstone: The Grand Tournament, Arkane Studios' Prey, and Activisions' Bakugan: Defenders of the Core. 

In addition to voicing characters, Brian has been the announcer for events at the Disneyland Hotel, The Walt Disney Family Museum, and the Anaheim Halloween Parade.

Brian is a voice acting instructor at the Voicetrax Academy in Sausalito, CA, and the on-line Global Voice Acting Academy.

Filmography

Film
The Addams Family 2 – Big Bad Ronny

Video games

 America's Army: Rise of a Soldier – Lead Southern Soldier
 Armored Core: Last Raven – Additional voices (credited as B. Sommer)
 Avenue Flo: Special Delivery - Bernie the Bookworm, Seymour the Senior
 Bakugan: Defenders of the Core – Drago, American Old Man
 Bone: Out from Boneville – Rat Creature 2
 Bone: The Great Cow Race – Dirk, Purple Rat Creature
 Chromehounds - Master Sergeant Jayrus Cole, Alexi Izmailov, Carlos Nadal
 CSI: Hard Evidence – Toby Hinkley
 Deadly Premonition – Keith Ingram
 Death Jr. 2: Root of Evil – Billy Galaxy, Louie Llama
 Diablo III – Monster voices
 Infinite Space – Pirate Valantin
 Kelvin and the Infamous Machine – Dr. Lupin, Gravedigger, Impresario, Librarian, Blacksmith
 League of Legends – Willump, Tryndamere, Warwick
 Phantasy Star Universe – Renvolt Magashi
 Psychonauts 2 – Bob Zanotto, Judge, Germ Crane Operator
 Sam & Max Beyond Time and Space – Monster, Brady Culture
 Sam & Max Save the World – Brady Culture, Drivers
 Sam & Max: The Devil's Playhouse – Frankie
 The Walking Dead – Danny St. John
 The Walking Dead: Season 2 – Pete
 The Wolf Among Us – Colin
 Manual Samuel – Narrator
 U.B. Funkeys – Jerry Pearl
 The Elder Scrolls OnLine - Mulaamnir, Yandir the Butcher

References

External links
 

American male video game actors
American male voice actors
20th-century American male actors
Year of birth missing (living people)
21st-century American male actors
People from San Leandro, California
Date of birth missing (living people)
Living people